The zygomaticotemporal nerve (zygomaticotemporal branch, temporal branch) is a small nerve of the face. It is derived from the zygomatic nerve, a branch of the maxillary nerve (CN V2). It is distributed to the skin of the side of the forehead. It communicates with the facial nerve and with the auriculotemporal branch of the mandibular nerve.

Structure 
The zygomaticotemporal nerve is a branch of the zygomatic nerve, a branch of the maxillary nerve. It runs along the lateral wall of the orbit in a groove in the zygomatic bone, receives a branch of communication from the lacrimal nerve, and passes through the zygomaticotemporal foramen in the zygomatic bone to enter the temporal fossa.

It ascends between the bone and the substance of the temporalis muscle. It pierces the temporal fascia about 2.5 cm above the zygomatic arch. This is around 17 mm lateral to and 6.5 mm superior to the lateral palpebral fissure. It is distributed to the skin of the side of the forehead.

The zygomaticotemporal nerve communicates with 2 other nerves, although the function of this is unknown. These nerves include:

 the facial nerve (in most people). This communication is around 36 mm lateral to and 2 mm superior to the lateral canthus (corner of the eye).
 the auriculotemporal branch of the mandibular nerve (V3).

As it pierces the temporal fascia, it gives off a small branch, which runs between the two layers of the fascia to the lateral angle of the orbit.

References

External links 
 
 
 http://www.dartmouth.edu/~humananatomy/figures/chapter_47/47-2.HTM

Maxillary nerve